John Rous was one of the two MPs for Ipswich in 1410 and November 1414. He was a merchant in the Staple of Calais and was survivied by his widow, Joan.

References

Rous 
14th-century births